Fernando Garcia Ponce (1933–1987) was a Mexican architect and abstract artist who belonged to the Generación de la Ruptura. García Ponce is best known for his abstract paintings and collages, most of which utilize structured and geometric forms rather than organic shapes.

Life 
García Ponce was born in Mérida, Yucatán, Mexico on August 25, 1933 to Juan García Rodes, immigrant from Spain, and María "Monina" Ponce G. Cantón, a member of the so-called "casta divina" of Yucatán. At the age of 11, García Ponce's family moved to Mexico City. In 1952, García Ponce enrolled at the National Autonomous University of Mexico to study architecture.

In 1967, García Ponce met the French Canadian actress Denise Brosseau, who had previously been married to Alejandro Jodorowsky. Brosseau and García Ponce married and had one child, Esteban García Brosseau.

On July 11, 1987, García Ponce died of a heart attack in Coyoacán, Mexico City; García Ponce was 53 at the time.

His elder brother, Juan Garcia Ponce, was a well known author and has published works about his brother's art and life.

Works 
Garcia Ponce is part of a generation of artist that began to seek new creative option after 1945. In Mexico this desire to create a new tradition was particularly difficult in Mexico, because of the omnipresence of the "three great" muralist: Siqueiros, Rivera and Orozco.  Garcia Ponce and other painters of his generation felt the necessity to establish the independence of painting towards any type of social or political program.

After traveling to Paris in his youth Garcia Ponce assimilated the philosophical background that characterized  Informalism in France and Abstract Expressionism in the U.S. of which he appreciated the freedom. Nonetheless his formation as an architect undeniably influenced his painting in which geometry and structure are essential components even if treated lyrically.

Garcia Ponce first teacher was the Spanish painter Enrique Climent who took him as his only student. García Ponce's artwork was first inspired by the cubist experience. The artist chose to work through depersonalization and the search of purity. Later, he became more focused in exploring the balance between form and space. His goal was to push his artwork past its initial appearance to the viewer.

García Ponce has allowed for his paintings to speak for themselves. His artworks are living spaces animated by the artist's spirit.

"Since his first exhibition, Fernando Garcia Ponce showed that his paintings could be presided over by a sign of rigor. Influenced by cubism, his early works clearly displayed the feeling that had determined the choices of painters before him. Before Braque or Picasso, the memory of Juan Gris. Facing the temptation to include the complete reality of the object in the closed atmosphere of the painting, facing the creative liberty and the will to transform, the painter would choose depersonalization, the search of final purity of which is capable of formal representation. His cubism was, in the most profound sense, analytic."

"His paintings are simple and difficult, empty spaces, spaces made alive through the presence of the creator’s spirit that becomes incarnated in the work."

Some of his works are:
 Self-portrait (1951)
 Natural Death (1959)
 Painting A-63 (1963)
 Bottling Peninsula, ca (1966)
 Relief and Space (1970)
 Homage to Picasso (1976)
 Glory and Death (1980)
 Horizontal Composition with Red Point (1986)

References

 Ponce, Juan García. Nueve Pintores Mexicanos. México, D.F.: Universidad Nacional Autónoma De México, 2006. Print.
 Vallarino, Roberto. Fernando García Ponce: La Atracción Por Poblar El Vacío. México: Dirección General De Publicaciones, 2002. Print.

External links
Artist's Website

Mexican painters
1987 deaths
1933 births
Abstract painters